Nicholas Peter Paulos (born February 26, 1992) is a Greek American professional basketball player for Psychiko of the Greek A2 Basket League. Paulos played college basketball at the University of North Carolina at Greensboro (UNCG). He is a 6'7" (2.01 m) tall swingman.

College career
Born in Salt Lake City, Utah, Paulos played college basketball at UNC Greensboro. With the Spartans, Paulos became the 21st player in UNCG men's basketball history to reach the 1,000-career point scoring mark, when he hit a second half 3-pointer against Samford. He ranks third all-time with 262 3-pointers made, and second all-time in UNCG history, with 125 games played.  He scored a career-high 30 points at Chattanooga, against the Mocs, and he set a UNCG single-game record with 10 three-pointers made off the bench, as he was 10-of-12 (83.3%) from long range, in just 21 minutes of action. He hit his first four three-pointers of the game, before hitting six straight, on consecutive possessions in the second half, for the single-game record.

As a junior, he scored a season-high 27 points against Davidson, and set a UNCG record with a perfect 9-of-9 shooting from long range. As a senior, Paulos led the Southern Conference, and ranked 12th in NCAA Division I, with 1,178 minutes played. His minutes played are the most by a Spartan, in a single season in program history.

College stats

|-
| style="text-align:left;"| 2011–12
| style="text-align:left;"| UNC Greensboro
| 29 || 0 || 13.8 || .361 || .348 || 1.000 || 2.1 || .3 || .4 || .2 || 5.5
|-
| style="text-align:left;"| 2012–13
| style="text-align:left;"| UNC Greensboro
| 31 || 3 || 20.0 || .428 || .406 || .826 || 2.7 || .5 || .7 || .2 || 8.0
|-
| style="text-align:left;"| 2013–14
| style="text-align:left;"| UNC Greensboro
| 32 || 32 || 29.6 || .419 || .365 || .889 || 3.5 || 1.0 || .4 || .4 || 8.4
|-
| style="text-align:left;"| 2014–15
| style="text-align:left;"| UNC Greensboro
| 32 || 32 || 35.7 || .453 || .434 || .741 || 3.7 || 1.6 || .7 || .3 || 10.7
|-
| style="text-align:left;"| Career
| style="text-align:left;"| 
| 124 || 67 || 25.1 || .421 || .393 || .831 || 3.0 || .8 || .5 || .3 || 8.2

Professional career
In July 2015, Paulos began his professional career in the top-tier Greek League club AEK Athens, after signing a two-year contract with them. On 3 November 2015, he was loaned to Doukas of the Greek 2nd Division. With Doukas, he averaged 9.1 points, 4.1 rebounds, and 2.1 assists per game, in 22 games played in the Greek 2nd Division 2015–16 season.

On 5 October 2016, he was loaned to Pagrati of the Greek 2nd Division from AEK Athens. With Pagrati, he averaged 11.7 points, 5.8 rebounds, and 1.8 assists per game, in 18 games played in the Greek 2nd Division 2016–17 season.

He joined the Greek 2nd Division club Psychiko, in 2017. With Psychiko, he averaged 15.2 points, 5.5 rebounds, and 1.5 assists, while shooting 44.5% from the 3 point line.

In July 2018, Paulos signed with Jamtland Basket of the top tier Swedish Basketligan. With Jamtland, he helped lead the club to their first ever semifinal appearance averaging 11.4 points, 5.2 rebounds, 2.1 assists, 1.2 steals, while shooting 54% from the field, 42.1% from the 3 point line, and 89% from the free throw line. It was the most successful team in Jamtland basket history.

On August 5, 2019, Paulos returned to Greece and signed with Kolossos Rodou.

In September of 2022, Paulos made his return to active basketball, signing back with Psychiko.

Personal life
Paulos has a Greek passport, due to his familial ethnic Greek heritage. His name in Greek is Νικόλαος "Νίκος" Πέτρος Παύλος (Nikolaos "Nikos" Petros Pavlos).

Notes

References

External links
EuroCup Profile
Eurobasket.com Profile
Draftexpress.com Profile
UNGC Spartans College Basketball Profile
Twitter Account
Instagram Account
Facebook Account

1992 births
Living people
AEK B.C. players
American expatriate basketball people in Sweden
American men's basketball players
Basketball players from Salt Lake City
Doukas B.C. players
Greek Basket League players
Greek men's basketball players
Jämtland Basket players
Kolossos Rodou B.C. players
Pagrati B.C. players
Psychiko B.C. players
Shooting guards
Small forwards
UNC Greensboro Spartans men's basketball players